Fractured is the second novel in the Atlanta series from bestselling author Karin Slaughter, published in 2008. The first instalment in the series is Triptych and the following one is Undone. The series follows Will Trent, a dyslexic Georgia Bureau of Investigation agent. The books also feature the characters Angie Polaski and Faith Mitchell. Slaughter also writes the Grant County series. The audiobook is narrated by Kathleen Early.

Plot summary 
Six months ago, Atlanta homicide detective Faith Mitchell's police captain mother was the focus of an investigation that resulted in her retirement and the  firing of six narcotics officers. It was a justified outcome, but the cops want to protect their own, and Faith, along with the entire Atlanta police force, are resentful of the man responsible, GBI agent Will Trent. Now Faith and Will are thrown together  on a shocking murder/kidnapping case involving some of the wealthiest and most powerful families in the city, and neither one of them is happy about the pairing. But Faith gradually discovers that not only is Will not the jerk she thought him to be, but he is also a highly skilled detective. He and Faith race frantically from the  dormitories of Georgia Tech to the halls of one of Atlanta's exclusive private academies to keep another corpse from surfacing.

References

External links 
 Karin Slaughter official website

2008 American novels
American thriller novels
Novels set in Georgia (U.S. state)
Delacorte Press books